Karago was a municipality in the Western Region of Uganda. In 2019, Karago was annexed by the city of Fort Portal, as part of the award of Tourism City status. It became a neighborhood in the Northern Division of Fort Portal City.

Location
Karago Municipality was located in Karago Parish, Bukuku subcounty, Burahya County, in Kabarole District, in the Toro sub-region, in the Western Region of Uganda.

The geographical coordinates of Karago are:0°40'37.0"N, 30°11'48.0"E
(Laitude:0.676944; Longitude:30.196667).

Overview
Karago is a growing urban neighborhood in Fort Portal City, the capital of Kabarole District and the largest city in the Toro sub-region. In 2015, the population of Karago was estimated at 12,045, of whom 6,127 (50.9 percent) were female and 5,918 (49.1 percent) were male.

Karago Drinking Water Supply Project
The government of Uganda (GOU), through the Ugandan Ministry of Water and Environment carried out the first phase of bringing potable water to Karago. Phase 1 concluded in October 2021.

In September 2022 the GOU launched the second phase of this water supply project, intended to bring clean water to 21 villages surrounding the neighborhood of Karago.

The engineering, procurement and construction (EPC) contractor for phase II is  Vidas Engineering Services, a Ugandan company with headquarters in Ntinda, in Kampala. Water and Sanitation Development Facility–South West (WSDF–SW), a collaborative undertaking between GOU and the European Union is the supervising engineer. The contract value is UGX:4.7 billion (approx. US$1.2 million). Construction is expected to take 12 months.

The table below illustrates the projection of the target population over the first 25 years of the project.

See also
 Rwenzori Mountains

Notes

References

External links
  Minister launches 4.7 billion Karago water project As of 18 September 2022.

Fort Portal
Toro sub-region
Populated places in Western Region, Uganda
Cities in the Great Rift Valley